Djamel Lifa (born 1 March 1969) is a French former professional boxer who competed from 1992 to 2001, holding the European super featherweight title from 1997 to 1998. As an amateur, he represented his country at the 1992 Summer Olympics.

Amateur career
Lifa claimed a record of 81-16-4 (13 KO) and competed at the 1992 Summer Olympics in Barcelona, Spain. In 1991 he won the bronze medal at the European Championships, held in Gothenburg, Sweden.

Amateur Highlights 
1989 French Featherweight Champion
1989 European Championships in Athens as a Featherweight. Lost to Kirkor Kirkorov (Bulgaria) points
1989 World Championships in Moscow as a Featherweight. Results were:
Defeated Saoud Al Mowaizri (Kuwait) points
Defeated Sandro Casamonica (Italy) points
Lost to Arnaldo Mesa (Cuba) points
1990 French Featherweight Champion
1991 3rd place at French Championships as a Featherweight, losing on points to Eddy Suarez
1991 3rd place at European Championships as a Featherweight at Gothenburg, Sweden. Results were:
Defeated Zoltan Kalocsai (Hungary) points
Defeated Kirkor Kirkorov (Bulgaria) points
Lost to Faat Gatin (Soviet Union) points
1991 competed as a Featherweight at the World Championships in Sydney, Australia. Results were:
Defeated John Wallace (New Zealand) TKO 3
Lost to Kirkor Kirkorov (Bulgaria) points
1992 Represented France as a Featherweight at Barcelona Olympic Games. Results were:
Defeated Charlie Balena (Philippines) points
Lost to Andreas Tews (Germany) 4-9

Professional career
As a professional Lifa had forty bouts, winning 35 (14 ko's) of them.

External links
 BoxingRecords
 
 Profile

1969 births
Living people
Sportspeople from Aix-en-Provence
Lightweight boxers
Boxers at the 1992 Summer Olympics
Olympic boxers of France
French male boxers